Ocean Realm was a quarterly magazine dedicated to scuba diving, underwater photography and marine life. The magazine was established in 1988. It was published in San Antonio, Texas and was globally distributed to subscribers. The founder was Richard Stewart. He also was the publisher and editor-in-chief of the magazine.

Stan Waterman wrote essays for the magazine. The last issue of Ocean Realm was #57 dated Spring 2001.

References

1988 establishments in Texas
2001 disestablishments in Texas
Defunct magazines published in the United States
Magazines established in 1988
Magazines disestablished in 2001
Magazines published in Texas
Mass media in San Antonio
Quarterly magazines published in the United States
Photography magazines